Bartender's Blues may refer to:

 "Bartender's Blues" (song), a 1977 song by James Taylor
 Bartender's Blues (album), a 1978 album by George Jones, featuring the song